Kabir is a rural locality (a selo) in Kurakhsky District, Republic of Dagestan, Russia. The population was 1,424 as of 2010. There are 16 streets.

Geography 
Kabir is located 26 km southeast of Kurakh (the district's administrative centre) by road. Ikra and Akhnig are the nearest rural localities.

Nationalities 
Lezgins live there.

References 

Rural localities in Kurakhsky District